Robert Jordan (1948–2007) was the American author of The Wheel of Time fantasy series.

Robert Jordan, Bob Jordan, and Bobby Jordan may also refer to:

Law
Robert H. Jordan (1916–1992), Georgia Supreme Court Justice
Robert Leon Jordan (born 1934), U.S. federal judge 
Robert E. Jordan III (1936–2010), U.S. General Counsel of the Army
Robert W. Jordan (born 1945), American lawyer and diplomat

Sports
Robert Jordan (baseball) (1867–1931), Negro leagues first baseman
Robert F. Jordan (1927–2004, Bobby), American bridge player
Robert Jordan (American football) (born 1986), free agent wide receiver

Others
"Bob Jordan", (a pen name of Fletcher Hanks, 1889–1976), American cartoonist
Robert Furneaux Jordan (1905–1978), English architect, architectural critic and novelist
Bobby Jordan (1923–1965), American actor
Robert B. Jordan (1932–2020), lieutenant governor of North Carolina
Bob Jordan (newscaster) (born 1943), American television newscaster
Bob Jordan (businessman), CEO of Southwest Airlines
Robert Jordan (character), character in Ernest Hemingway's For Whom The Bell Tolls

See also
Jordan (name)